Nicole Demers (born January 15, 1950) is a Canadian politician.

Demers was born in Montreal, Quebec. An administrator of health services and a restaurant owner, Demers was first elected into the House of Commons of Canada in the 2004 Canadian federal election. She was the Bloc Québécois candidate in the riding of Laval and she defeated Liberal Pierre Lafleur by nearly 7,000 votes. She was the Bloc's critic to Families and Caregivers from August 6, 2004, to February 9, 2006, and Bloc's critic for Seniors until 2011. However, she was defeated in the 2011 election by NDP's José Nunez-Melo.

External links 
 

1950 births
Bloc Québécois MPs
Women members of the House of Commons of Canada
French Quebecers
Living people
Members of the House of Commons of Canada from Quebec
Politicians from Laval, Quebec
Politicians from Montreal
Women in Quebec politics
21st-century Canadian politicians
21st-century Canadian women politicians